Patrick Joseph Doyle (10 March 1889 – 29 March 1971) was an Irish professional golfer who played during the early 20th century. Doyle finished in tenth place in the 1913 U.S. Open. Doyle was a frequent competitor in the PGA Championship. He posted particularly good results in the 1926 and 1928 PGA Championships. In the 1926 tournament, he lost to Walter Hagen by the score of 6 and 5 in the quarter-finals.

Early life
Patrick Doyle was born in Kindlestown Upper, County Wicklow, Ireland, outside of Dublin. He worked at several golf clubs in Ireland and finished second at the 1912 Irish PGA Championship.

Golf career
Doyle came to the United States in 1908, became a naturalized citizen in 1914, and worked at various golf clubs including the Myopia Hunt Club (South Hamilton, Massachusetts), South Shore Field Club (Long Island, New York), Deal Golf & Country Club (Deal, New Jersey), Elmsford (New York), and Linwood Country Club (Linwood, New Jersey). He won one event on what is now the PGA Tour, the 1918 Philadelphia Open Championship (co-champion with Arthur Reid).

1913 U.S. Open
The 1913 U.S. Open was held 18–20 September at The Country Club in Brookline, Massachusetts, a suburb southwest of Boston.  Amateur Francis Ouimet, age 20, won his only U.S. Open title in an 18-hole playoff, five strokes ahead of Britons Harry Vardon and Ted Ray. Doyle finished in tenth place, carding rounds of 78-80-73-80=311. He won $30 as his share of the purse.

Death
Doyle died on 29 March 1971 at Mount Vernon, New York, aged 82.

PGA Tour wins
1918 Philadelphia Open Championship (tied with Arthur Reid)

Results in major championships

Note: Doyle never played in the Masters Tournament or The Open Championship.

NYF = Tournament not yet founded
NT = No tournament
DNP = Did not play
R64, R32, R16, QF, SF = Round in which player lost in PGA Championship match play
? = Unknown
"T" indicates a tie for a place
Yellow background for top-10

References

Irish male golfers
PGA Tour golfers
Golfers from New York (state)
Irish emigrants to the United States
Sportspeople from County Wicklow
1889 births
1971 deaths